Orfeo Reda (born 9 November 1932 in Carolei) is an Italian painter and artist.

Biography

He was born in Pantanolungo di Carolei in 1932, resides in Amantea. At 16 he won first prize at the Fiera Campionaria in Cosenza with a scholarship offered by the Chamber of Commerce. He achieved his maturity at the Art Institute and his drawing diploma at the Liceo Artistico Mattia Preti in Reggio Calabria under the guidance of the illustrious Art Historian prof. Alfonso Francipane.

Then he dedicated himself to the teaching of artistic disciplines such as: Drawing and History of Art at the Higher Middle Schools and Artistic Education at the Middle Schools. He carried out and carries out his activity as a painter in his studio in Amantea where he still resides.

His works appear in public collections all over the world and numerous are the prizes awarded to the artist, such as: Riace Bronzes Prize in Reggio Calabria; Masters of Italian art trophy in Salsomaggiore; Drach Prize in Palma de Majorca; Kowloon Prize in Hong Kong; Expo arte Tirrenia 20th edition (where the artist was awarded by the President of the Republic of Malta).;

Painting exhibitions 

 Accademia D'Europa, Naples (1985)
 Local Prize "il Glicine", Amantea, with blessing of the Holy See (1986)
 Eur Art Expo, Rome (1989)
 Premio Palazzo Reale Malta, Valletta
 Pantheon d'Oro - Bologna (1992) 
 Florence Paint Exhibition, Florence (1994)
 Mostra Antologica - Galleria Amedeo Modigliani, Milan (1995)
 56th Venice Biennale, Venice (2015)

Gallery

Bibliography

Notes

1932 births
Italian male painters
People from the Province of Cosenza
20th-century Italian painters
21st-century Italian painters
Living people
20th-century Italian male artists
21st-century Italian male artists